Roberto "Rafu" Rodríguez-Bertrán (born August 8, 1986) is a professional beach volleyball player from Puerto Rico who currently competes on the NORCECA Beach Volleyball Circuit. He competes with Orlando Irrizarry.

Representing his home country at the Swatch FIVB World Tour during the 2006 season, playing with Christopher Underwood, they accumulated 30 points.

He also played at the AVP Young Guns 2009 at Fort Lauderdale finishing in 7th place.

References

External links
 
 
 

1986 births
Living people
People from Guaynabo, Puerto Rico
Puerto Rican men's beach volleyball players
Pan American Games competitors for Puerto Rico
Beach volleyball players at the 2011 Pan American Games
Beach volleyball players at the 2015 Pan American Games
21st-century Puerto Rican people